A List of churches in Shetland, Scotland.

The Reformation reached Shetland in 1560. This was an apparently peaceful transition and there is little evidence of religious intolerance in Shetland's recorded history. A variety of different religious denominations are represented in the islands.

The islands were originally covered by 12 civil parishes: Bressay, Delting, Dunrossness, Fetlar, Lerwick, Nesting, Northmaven, Sandsting, Tingwall, Unst, Walls and Sandness, and Yell.

Church of Scotland
The Church of Scotland has a Presbytery of Shetland.
 Bressay Church, Bressay
 Fetlar Kirk, Fetlar
 St Magnus Kirk, Hamnavoe, Yell
 St Columba's Church, Lerwick, Mainland
 St John's Church, Baltasound, Unst
Whalsay Parish Church, Whalsay

Episcopalian

Shetland is part of the Diocese of Aberdeen and Orkney of the Scottish Episcopal Church.
 The Chapel of Jesus the Good Shepherd, Westing, Unst is maintained by the Anglican religious order of nuns, the Society of Our Lady of the Isles. Their previous place of worship, the Chapel of Christ the Encompasser, Fetlar has now been sold.
 St Colman's Church, Burravoe, Yell, the most northerly Episcopal parish church in Scotland.
 St Magnus' Church, Lerwick, Mainland.

Methodist
The Methodist Church has a relatively high membership in Shetland, which is a District of the Methodist Church (with the whole of the rest of Scotland comprising a separate District). There are 53 Methodist congregations in Scotland, of which 13 (almost a quarter) are located in Shetland.
Haroldswick Methodist Church, Haroldswick, Unst is the most northerly church building in the UK.

Roman Catholic
Shetland is part of the Roman Catholic Diocese of Aberdeen. There is only one Catholic Church in Shetland, located in Lerwick. However, Mass is said in other places, using other places of worship belonging to other Christian groups on an occasional basis.
 Church of St Margaret and the Sacred Heart, Lerwick, Mainland

Citations

References
 Schei, Liv Kjørsvik (2006) The Shetland Isles. Grantown-on-Spey. Colin Baxter Photography.

External links

Churches in Shetland
Shetland